Myelois echinopisella is a species of snout moth in the genus Myelois. It was described by Pierre Chrétien in 1911 and is known from Pakistan, Iran and North Africa, including Algeria.

References

Moths described in 1911
Phycitini